The 2006–07 All-Ireland Junior Club Football Championship was the sixth staging of the All-Ireland Junior Club Football Championship since its establishment by the Gaelic Athletic Association.

The All-Ireland final was played on 10 March 2007 at Croke Park in Dublin, between St Patrick's, Greencastle and Duagh. St Patrick's, Greencastle won the match by 0-13 to 0-12 to claim their first ever championship title.

All-Ireland Junior Club Football Championship

All-Ireland final

References

2006 in Irish sport
2007 in Irish sport
All-Ireland Junior Club Football Championship
All-Ireland Junior Club Football Championship